Etiprednol is a synthetic glucocorticoid corticosteroid.

References

Diketones
Diols
Glucocorticoids
Pregnanes
Carboxylate esters
Ethyl esters